Lemont Furnace is an unincorporated community and census-designated place in North Union Township, Fayette County, Pennsylvania, United States. The community is part of the Pittsburgh metropolitan area. At the 2010 census, the population of Lemont Furnace was 827.

The campus serves the students of Fayette, Greene, Somerset, Washington, and Westmoreland counties in southwestern Pennsylvania.

Demographics

References

External links 
Lemont Furnace, coal patch town

Census-designated places in Pennsylvania
Census-designated places in Fayette County, Pennsylvania